Kropotkinskoye Urban Settlement is the name of several municipal formations in Russia.

Kropotkinskoye Urban Settlement, a municipal formation which the work settlement of Kropotkin and the settlement of Svetly in Bodaybinsky District of Irkutsk Oblast are incorporated as
Kropotkinskoye Urban Settlement, a municipal formation within Kavkazsky Municipal District which the Town of Kropotkin in Krasnodar Krai is incorporated as

See also
Kropotkinsky (disambiguation)

References

Notes

Sources

